The Cleveland Open was a golf tournament on the PGA Tour. It was played from 1963 to 1972 at a various courses in the greater Cleveland, Ohio area.

Host courses

Winners

See also
DAP Championship, a Web.com Tour Finals event in the Cleveland suburb of Beachwood to begin in 2016
Rust-Oleum Championship, a Web.com Tour event in the Cleveland suburb of Westlake from 2013 to 2014
Legend Financial Group Classic, a Web.com Tour event from 2005 to 2007
Greater Cleveland Open, a Web.com Tour event from 1990 to 2001

References

Former PGA Tour events
Golf in Ohio
Sports competitions in Cleveland
Recurring sporting events established in 1963
Recurring sporting events disestablished in 1972
1963 establishments in Ohio
1972 disestablishments in Ohio